The name Gilma has been used for eight tropical cyclones in the Eastern Pacific Ocean.
 Hurricane Gilma (1978) – a Category 3 hurricane.
 Hurricane Gilma (1982) – a Category 3 hurricane, which passed south of Hawaii.
 Tropical Storm Gilma (1988) – a tropical storm, which made landfall on Hawaii as a tropical depression.
 Hurricane Gilma (1994) – a Category 5 hurricane; strongest of its season.
 Hurricane Gilma (2000) – a Category 1 hurricane, that did not affect land.
 Tropical Storm Gilma (2006) – a weak tropical storm.
 Hurricane Gilma (2012) – a Category 1 hurricane that never affected land.
 Tropical Storm Gilma (2018) – a weak and short-lived tropical storm.

Pacific hurricane set index articles